Takuto Kominami (born 26 July 1995) is a Japanese athlete specializing in the javelin throw. He represented Japan at the 2020 Summer Olympics in the javelin throw.

Career
In April 2019, Kominami represented Japan at the 2019 Asian Athletics Championships in the javelin throw and finished in 11th place. In June 2021, he competed at the 2021 Japan Championships in Athletics and won a gold medal in the javelin throw.

Kominami represented Japan at the 2020 Summer Olympics in the javelin throw.

References

1995 births
Living people
Japanese male javelin throwers
Olympic athletes of Japan
Athletes (track and field) at the 2020 Summer Olympics
Sportspeople from Sapporo
20th-century Japanese people
21st-century Japanese people